Euseius aferulus is a species of mite in the family Phytoseiidae.

References

aferulus
Articles created by Qbugbot
Animals described in 1959